Northern Lights 220 is an Indian reserve of the Peter Ballantyne Cree Nation in Saskatchewan. It is in the city of Prince Albert.

References

Urban Indian reserves in Canada
Indian reserves in Saskatchewan
Division No. 15, Saskatchewan
Prince Albert, Saskatchewan
Peter Ballantyne Cree Nation